The 2009–10 season is Sunderland's third consecutive season in the top division of English football, the Premier League.

Ricky Sbragia was replaced by Steve Bruce in the close season.  His aim is to improve on the club's 16th position the previous season.

Darren Bent was the top scorer in the Premier League with 24 goals. Andy Reid was the top scorer in the League Cup with two goals. Fraizer Campbell was the top scorer in the FA Cup with two goals. Darren Bent was the top scorer in all competitions with 25 goals.

At the end of the season, Darren Bent won both the club's official Player of the Season and the SAFC Supporters' Association awards. Jordan Henderson won both the club's official Young Player of the Season and the SAFC Supporters' Association Young Player of the Season awards.

Season summary
Sunderland broke their transfer record with the £10 million signing of Tottenham Hotspur striker Darren Bent. This proved to be a wise investment as Bent scored 25 goals in all competitions during the season, all but one of them in the league. No other player outside the top eight clubs managed even half as many as Bent, who was only outscored by Didier Drogba and Wayne Rooney.

Transfers

In

Summer

January

Out

Summer

January

First-team squad
Source:

Left club during season

Results
Sunderland's score comes first

Football League Cup

FA Cup

Premier League

Final league table

Appearances and goals

|-
! colspan=14 style=background:#dcdcdc; text-align:center| Goalkeepers

|-
! colspan=14 style=background:#dcdcdc; text-align:center| Defenders

|-
! colspan=14 style=background:#dcdcdc; text-align:center| Midfielders

|-
! colspan=14 style=background:#dcdcdc; text-align:center| Forwards

|-
! colspan=14 style=background:#dcdcdc; text-align:center| Players transferred out during the season

|-

Goal scorers

References

 
 
 
 
 
 
 
 
 
 
 
 
 
 
 
 
 
 
 
 
 
 
 
 
 
 
 
 
 
 
 
 
 
 
 
 
 
 
 
 
 
 
 
 
 
 
 
 
 
 
 
 
 
 
 
 
 
 
 
 
 
 
 
 
 
 
 
 
 
 
 

Sunderland A.F.C. seasons
Sunderland